The Chief of Staff to the President of Belarus also known as the Head of the Presidential Administration is the head of the Presidential Administration of Belarus. The position was created by President Lukashenko in July 1994. The Chief of Staff is responsible for general management of presidential activity. The incumbent Chief of Staff is Ihar Serheenka (Igor Sergeenko), who assumed the position in December 2019.

The following responsibilities are entrusted to the chief of staff:
 Providing management of the departments heads; 
 Allocate responsibilities to Deputy Chief of Staff; 
 Coordinate the activities of Presidential aids and advisors; 
 Enact the proposal of draft laws, decrees and orders;
 Presents candidates for official positions;

Office holders

First Deputy Heads
  (15 July 1995 — 5 March 1997)
 Uladzimir Rusakevich (15 July 1997 — 19 June 2000)
 Vladimir Zametalin (19 June 2000 — 12 September 2001)
 Stanislav Knyazev (12 September 2001 — 25 March 2003)
  (18 August 2003 — 4 January 2006)
  (4 January 2006 — 30 October 2008)
 Natallya Pyatkyevich (9 January 2009 — 28 December 2010)
 Alexander Radkov/Konstantin Martynetsky (28 December 2010 — 5 December 2016)
 Maksim Ryzhankow (21 December 2016 — present)

References

Political chiefs of staff
Presidential Administration of Belarus